A bong is a device used for smoking cannabis, tobacco, or other substances. Can also be used for false flowers.

Bong may also refer to:

Arts, entertainment, and media
 Bong game, a radio game show
 Doctor Bong, a fictional character from the Marvel Comics universe

People
 Bong (surname), a surname in Chinese, Korean, Swedish, and other cultures (including a list of people with the surname)
 Baik Bong, North Korean writer
 Bong Coo (born 1948), Filipino world champion tenpin bowler
 Bong Galanza (born 1992), Filipino basketball player
 Bong Go (born 1974), Filipino presidential aide
 Bong Hawkins (born 1967), Filipino basketball player
 Bong Pascual (born 1970), Filipino basketball referee
 Bong Ramos (born 1961), Filipino basketball coach
 Bong Revilla (born 1966), Filipino actor and politician
 Bongbong Marcos (born 1957) Filipino politician and 17th president of the Philippines

Places
 Bong, Maasbree, Venlo, Netherlands, a hamlet
 Bong, Velden, Venlo, Netherlands, a hamlet
 Bong County, Liberia
 Bong Town, Liberia
 Bong Recreation Area, Wisconsin, USA, a state park

Other uses
 Bong (term), an affectionate slang for Bengali people from West Bengal
 Bong, an onomatopœia of the sound of a bell or gong
 Bong, a type of piton
 Beer bong or funneling, a drinking game where the aim is to rapidly ingest large quantities of beer or other beverages
 Bong, a modern slang term for a person from the United Kingdom with the name jokingly taken from the bell chime of Big Ben

See also
Bang (disambiguation)
Bhang
Bing (disambiguation)
Boong
Bung